Asus PadFone is a smartphone manufactured by Asus and released in April 2012. The phone is marketed with companion tablet dock and keyboard dock accessories intended to improve functionality and battery life. It fits into a 10-inch tablet dock.  It is not the same as the Asus PadFone mini 4.3, revealed by Asus in December 2013 since that operates on Android 4.3 Jelly Bean and is skinned with the Asus' ZenUI.

Specifications

Hardware
The Asus PadFone has a 4-inch WVGA (480 x 800 pixel) IPS+ LED-backlit display.  The Asus PadFone mini has 8GB of built-in storage, an 8-megapixel 'PixelMaster' rear f/2.0 BSI camera, 2-megapixel front-facing camera, and a 4.5Wh 1170mAh non-removable polymer battery. The tablet dock features an 8.3Wh 2100mAh non-removable polymer battery to supplement this.

Software
Asus PadFone ships with Android 4.3 Jellybean.

Successors

The successor to this phone is the PadFone 2, which was released in October 2012.  It features a 4.7 inch Super IPS+ screen with HD (1280×720) resolution. It's camera is able to record video with 1080p (Full HD) at 30 frames per second and 720p (HD) at 60 frames per second.

The successor to the PadFone 2 is the PadFone Infinity, which was released in April 2013. It features a 5-inch Super IPS+ screen with Super HD display, (1920 x 1200) resolution with 441 ppi.

The successor to the PadFone Infinity is the PadFone X for the US market, which was released in June 2014, and PadFone S for the rest of the world.

The PadFone S (PF500KL) was released in July 2014. It's camera has the ability to record video with 2160p (4K) at 12 to 15 frames per second, 1080p at 30 frames per second and 720p at 60 frames per second.

References

External links
 .
 .
 .
 .
 .

Padfone
Mobile phones introduced in 2012
Android (operating system) devices
Discontinued smartphones